The Belgian State Railways Type 23, later known as the NMBS/SNCB Type 53, was a class of  steam locomotives built between 1904 and 1927.

The 436 members of the class were used as shunters at most of the railway stations operated by the Belgian State Railways and its successor, the National Railway Company of Belgium (NMBS/SNCB), which was established in 1926.

One member of the class, no. 53.320, has been preserved by the NMBS/SNCB, and will be part of the collection of Train World, the Belgian national railway museum.  It is now painted in a chocolate livery, and bears its earlier NMBS/SNCB number, 5620.

See also

History of rail transport in Belgium
List of SNCB/NMBS classes
Rail transport in Belgium

References

External links
 ETH-Bibliothek Zürich, Bildarchiv. Société Anonyme de St-Léonard, Liège, Chemins de Fer de l‘Etat belge, type 23, viewer

0-8-0T locomotives
National Railway Company of Belgium locomotives
Railway locomotives introduced in 1904
Steam locomotives of Belgium
Standard gauge locomotives of Belgium